Nathalie Biancheri is an Italian film director and screenwriter based in London. She is known for directing the films Wolf and Nocturnal.

Career
Nathalie graduated from King's College London and began her career as a documentary researcher at the BBC. She co-founded the production company Feline Films with Jessie Fisk.

Nathalie's feature film directorial debut, Nocturnal, premiered at the BFI London Film Festival in 2019. Her second feature film Wolf, premiered at the Toronto International Film Festival in 2021. She was named one of IndieWire's "22 Rising Female Filmmakers to Watch" in 2022 and the Irish Times's "50 people to watch" in 2021.

Filmography

Awards and nominations

References

External links
 

Living people
Italian women film directors
Italian women screenwriters
Italian screenwriters
Italian film directors
20th-century Italian screenwriters
Year of birth missing (living people)